Rene Mihelič (born 5 July 1988) is a Slovenian professional footballer who plays as a midfielder for SC Kalsdorf.

Club career
Mihelič came through NK Maribor's youth academy, before making his senior team debut in September 2005. In 2010 he was signed by the Portuguese team Nacional.

On 8 February 2013, Bulgarian side Levski Sofia confirmed Mihelič had joined on loan until the end of the season, with the option of making the move permanent. He made his official A PFG debut for Levski Sofia on 17 March 2013, after coming on as a substitute in the 0–0 home draw with Montana. Mihelič scored his first goal in his first appearance as a starter for Levski Sofia, netting the equalizer in the 1–1 away draw with PFC Cherno More Varna on 30 March 2013.

Mihelič returned to Slovenia in October 2013, when he joined Zavrč.

On 25 January 2014, Mihelič was signed by Hungarian League club Debrecen. On 22 July 2014, Mihelič scored his first goal in the 2014–15 UEFA Champions League qualifying round against Cliftonville at the Nagyerdei Stadion.

On 27 July 2017, Mihelič joined Indian Super League franchise Chennaiyin FC on a free transfer after his contract with Latvian club Riga expired. He scored two goals in fourteen appearances and won the league title with his team. On 11 August 2018, he joined fellow league club Delhi Dynamos FC on a one-year deal.

International career
Between 2006 and 2010, Mihelič was a member of the Slovenian youth selections from under-18 to under-21. In August 2007, he made his debut for the senior team when he was 19 years, one month and 17 days old, which was a record for the youngest player ever to play for the national team at the time, before the record was broken by Petar Stojanović in 2014.

Honours
Maribor
Slovenian PrvaLiga: 2008–09
Slovenian Cup: 2009–10
Slovenian Supercup: 2009

Debrecen
Hungarian League: 2013–14

Chennaiyin FC
 Indian Super League: 2017–18

References

External links

 Player profile at NZS 
 
 

1988 births
Living people
Sportspeople from Maribor
Slovenian footballers
Slovenian expatriate footballers
Slovenia youth international footballers
Slovenia under-21 international footballers
Slovenia international footballers
Association football midfielders
NK Maribor players
C.D. Nacional players
PFC Levski Sofia players
NK Zavrč players
Debreceni VSC players
Hapoel Ra'anana A.F.C. players
Riga FC players
Chennaiyin FC players
Odisha FC players
Persib Bandung players
FK Sutjeska Nikšić players
Slovenian PrvaLiga players
Primeira Liga players
First Professional Football League (Bulgaria) players
Nemzeti Bajnokság I players
Israeli Premier League players
Indian Super League players
Liga 1 (Indonesia) players
Montenegrin First League players
Austrian Regionalliga players
Slovenian expatriate sportspeople in Portugal
Expatriate footballers in Portugal
Slovenian expatriate sportspeople in Bulgaria
Expatriate footballers in Bulgaria
Slovenian expatriate sportspeople in Hungary
Expatriate footballers in Hungary
Slovenian expatriate sportspeople in Israel
Expatriate footballers in Israel
Slovenian expatriate sportspeople in Latvia
Expatriate footballers in Latvia
Slovenian expatriate sportspeople in India
Expatriate footballers in India
Slovenian expatriate sportspeople in Indonesia
Expatriate footballers in Indonesia
Slovenian expatriate sportspeople in Montenegro
Expatriate footballers in Montenegro
Slovenian expatriate sportspeople in Austria
Expatriate footballers in Austria